Loreto College, Victoria is an independent Roman Catholic secondary day school for girls, located in central Ballarat, Victoria, Australia.

History
Loreto College Ballarat was the first Loreto school in Australia, established by Mother Gonzaga Barry and her community of religious sisters in 1875 following an invitation from the Bishop of Ballarat to establish a school for girls. This boarding school was known as Loreto Abbey Mary's Mount and was soon followed by a day school, also in Ballarat, known as Loreto Convent Dawson Street.

Mother Gonzaga had come to Australia from Ireland and established local primary schools as well as Loreto schools in Melbourne, Sydney, Brisbane, Adelaide and Perth.

From its founding in 1875 until 1973, boys were admitted from kindergarten until grades two or three; since 1973, the school has admitted girls only.

In 1978, Dawson Street Day School and Mary's Mount were formally amalgamated to form Loreto College Ballarat, with Years 7 - 8 at Dawson Street and Years 9 - 12 at Sturt Street - Mary's Mount. In 2007, Loreto's junior and senior campuses were combined on the one campus at Sturt Street following the construction of the Mary Ward Centre for Years 7 -8. The Dawson Street site closed in 2006, and was used by Ballarat High School for a short time before being bought by the Quest Apartments group. In 2015, the college opened  The Mary's Mount Centre. This performing arts center  houses a 500-seat theatre along with music and dance studios, classrooms and multimedia labs.

Houses
There are four houses at Loreto College Ballarat, named Barry, Mornane, Mulhall and Ward. The colours of the houses differ from school to school. At Loreto College Ballarat, Barry is red, Mornane is gold, Mulhall is green and Ward is blue. The houses are named in honour of great patrons of the school.

Barry House is named after Mother Gonzaga Barry who led the first group of Loreto nuns to Australia from Ireland in 1875. She began the Loreto school in Ballarat, quickly following that with other schools across the country. She was a great pioneer in education opening teachers' colleges and preparing girls for university.

Mornane House is named for Mother Stanislaus Mornane, who was one of the very early pupils of Loreto Abbey Ballarat in 1876 and became the first Australian Loreto pupil to enter the institute in Australia. She spent many years in Sydney where she was a teacher and Mother Superior.

Mulhall House takes its name from Mother Stanislaus Mulhall. She arrived in Australia in 1897 teaching at Mary's Mount and for many years was the Mistress of Novices. Mother Mulhall had a passion for music and in 1915 followed Mother Gonzaga as Provincial Australian.

Ward House is named after Mary Ward, foundress of the Institute of the Blessed Virgin Mary (IBVM) as the Loreto nuns are officially called. Born in England in 1585, she travelled valiantly across Europe founding schools in many countries and setting up a new style of religious life. She died in 1645 confident that "women in time to come will do much".

Sport 
Loreto is a member of the Ballarat Associated Schools (BAS).

BAS premierships 
Loreto has won the following BAS premierships. Combined premierships were won with St Patrick's College.

Girls:

 Athletics (20) - 1978, 1979, 1990, 1991, 1997, 1998, 1999, 2000, 2001, 2002, 2006, 2008, 2009, 2010, 2011, 2012, 2013, 2014, 2016, 2018
 Badminton - 2016
 Basketball (18) - 1978, 1980, 1983, 1984, 1985, 1986, 1987, 1988, 1989, 1991, 1992, 1993, 1994, 1995, 1996, 2006, 2007, 2008
 Cricket (22) - 1990, 1991, 1992, 1993, 1995, 1996, 1999, 2001, 2002, 2003, 2004, 2005, 2006, 2007, 2008, 2009, 2010, 2011, 2012, 2013, 2014, 2015
 Cross Country (20) - 1982, 1983, 1984, 1985, 1986, 1987, 1989, 1990, 1991, 1992, 1993, 1994, 1995, 1996, 1997, 1998, 1999, 2000, 2012, 2018
 Football (2) - 2001, 2008
 Hockey (4) - 2010, 2011, 2013, 2015
 Lap of the Lake (24) - 1982, 1983, 1984, 1985, 1986, 1987, 1988, 1989, 1990, 1991, 1992, 1993, 1994, 1995, 1996, 1997, 1998, 1999, 2000, 2001, 2009, 2012, 2018, 2019
 Netball (8) - 1977, 1978, 1990, 1994, 1995, 1996, 2001, 2018
 Road Relay (7) - 1997, 1998, 2000, 2009, 2010, 2012, 2014
 Soccer (8) - 2001, 2002, 2004, 2006, 2008, 2011, 2017, 2018
 Softball (12) - 1964, 1967, 1978, 1980, 1981, 1982, 1988, 1991, 1993, 1999, 2000, 2011
 Volleyball (3) - 1982, 1987, 2013

Combined:

 Athletics (8) - 1990, 1997, 1998, 1999, 2000, 2001, 2002, 2003
 Badminton (11) - 1983, 1984, 1986, 1992, 1999, 2000, 2001, 2002, 2005, 2008, 2010
 Cross Country (18) - 1982, 1983, 1984, 1985, 1986, 1987, 1989, 1990, 1991, 1992, 1993, 1994, 1995, 1996, 1997, 1998, 1999, 2000
 Lap of the Lake (20) - 1982, 1983, 1984, 1985, 1986, 1987, 1988, 1989, 1990, 1991, 1992, 1993, 1994, 1995, 1996, 1997, 1998, 1999, 2000, 2001
 Road Relay (4) - 1997, 1998, 1999, 2000

Notable alumnae

Mary Delahunty, Victorian Labor Minister for Arts and Women's Affairs and a former ABC journalist
 Dame Doris Fitton (1897-1985), actress and theatrical producer
Lesbia Harford (1891–1927), poet, novelist, political activist
 Michelle Payne, first female jockey to win the Melbourne Cup (won in 2015)
 Kate Torney, CEO State Library of Victoria, Previously: Director of ABC News
 Sophie Van De Heuvel, Australian rules footballer with the Geelong Football Club
 June Wright (1919-2012), author of six murder mysteries.
Juliana Addison, State Labor Member for Wendouree (2018–present)

Related schools
There are six other Loreto related schools in Australia. These include:
 John XXIII College (Perth)
 Loreto Nedlands (Perth)
 Loreto Coorparoo (Brisbane)
 Loreto Kirribilli (Sydney)
 Loreto Mandeville Hall (Melbourne)
 Loreto Marryatville (Adelaide)
 Loreto Normanhurst (Sydney)

There are also many other Loreto schools worldwide including Ireland and India.

See also

 List of schools in Ballarat
 List of non-government schools in Victoria
 Victorian Certificate of Education

References

External links
 Loreto College website

Educational institutions established in 1875
Girls' schools in Victoria (Australia)
Victoria
Ballarat Associated Schools
Schools in Ballarat
1875 establishments in Australia
Catholic secondary schools in Victoria (Australia)
Alliance of Girls' Schools Australasia